Titanic Town is a 1998 film directed by Roger Michell and starring Julie Walters, Ciarán Hinds, Nuala O'Neill, and Ciarán McMenamin. It is set in Belfast during the Troubles.

It was filmed in Shortmead Drive and Green Close in Cheshunt, Hertfordshire.

Premise
Aidan and Bernie McPhelimy are a mother and father caught in the Northern Ireland Troubles in Belfast (known for building the RMS Titanic). Bernie's close friend is killed in the crossfire and so she becomes involved in the peace process.

Cast

The McPhelimy family
Ciarán Hinds as Aidan McPhelimy
Julie Walters as Bernie McPhelimy
Nuala O'Neill as Annie McPhelimy
James Loughran as Thomas McPhelimy
Barry Loughran as Brendan McPhelimy
Elizabeth Donaghy as Sinead McPhelimy
 Mal Rogers as Uncle Jimmy

The Englishmen at Stormont
Oliver Ford Davies as Whittington
Nicholas Woodeson as Immonger (as Nick Woodeson)

Others
Ciarán McMenamin as Dino/Owen
Janice Pollock as Patsy French
Caolan Byrne as Niall French
Aingeal Grehan as Deirdre
Des McAleer as Finnbar
B.J. Hogg as Chair
Doreen Hepburn as Nora
Mairead Redmond as Mairead

External links

Titanic Town at Box Office Mojo

1998 films
Northern Irish films
1998 drama films
Films about The Troubles (Northern Ireland)
Films directed by Roger Michell
Films set in Belfast
Films shot in Northern Ireland
British drama films
Films scored by Trevor Jones
1999 drama films
1999 films
1990s English-language films
1990s British films